The Aeronca C-1 Cadet was a high performance version of the Aeronca C-2 developed by Aeronca and first flown in 1931.

Development
The C-1 was a wire-braced high-wing monoplane with a fixed tail skid landing gear and powered by a  Aeronca E-113 flat-twin piston engine. Apart from a more powerful engine the  C-1 also had a strengthened fuselage and reduced span wings compared with the C-2. Only three were built and following the death of a company executive when the prototype crashed, one was scrapped and the other was converted into an Aeronca C-2N.

Specifications

See also

References

Notes

Bibliography

1930s United States civil utility aircraft
C-1
High-wing aircraft
Single-engined tractor aircraft
Aircraft first flown in 1931